Cementation may refer to:

Cementation (biology), the process whereby some sessile bivalve mollusks (and some other shelled invertebrates) attach themselves permanently to a hard substrate
Cementation (geology), the process of deposition of dissolved mineral components in the interstices of sediments
Cementation (medical), a small deposit of calcium, similar to a cyst
Cementation (metallurgy), a process in which ions are reduced to zero valence at a solid metallic interface
Cementation process, an obsolete technique for making steel by carburization of iron
Carburization, a process for surface hardening of low-carbon steel
 Cementation Company, a British construction business